The men's team épée competition of the fencing event at the 2015 Southeast Asian Games is being held on 6 June 2015 at the OCBC Arena Hall 2 in Singapore.

Schedule

Results

Final standing

References

External links
 

Men's team epee